Stravaj is a village and a former municipality in the Elbasan County, eastern Albania. At the 2015 local government reform it became a subdivision of the municipality Prrenjas. The population at the 2011 census was 2,427. The municipal unit consists of the villages Farret, Gaferr, Shqiponje, Sopot, Stranik and Stravaj.

References

Former municipalities in Elbasan County
Administrative units of Prrenjas
Villages in Elbasan County